"Mama Lover" (Russian: Mama Luba) is a song by Russian group Serebro, which was released as the lead single from their second studio album of the same name. The song was written by member Olga Seryabkina and co-written and produced by Maxim Fadeev. It was released on September 15, 2011 by Monolit Records and Ego. "Mama Lover" received positive reviews from music critics, praising the catchiness and fun vibe towards the song. Commercially, the song is one of the group's most successful charting singles, peaking in countries including Russia, Italy, Belgium, the Czech Republic and Spain.

The music video was released on September 15, 2011 as an exclusive of Ello.com. The music video received critical acclaim from many critics, noting the simplicity of the video and the girls for being edgy and provocative. "Mama Lover" is considered Serebro's most popular song, since it has been featured in a lot of press releases.

Background
"Mama Lover" is Serebro's eighth single. The single was originally released on August 8, 2011. However, when it was announced that a music video was going to be released, a Russian release was also announced. There are two official versions; the English version and the Russian version. Both versions were released as a digital download.

Reception

Recognition
"Mama Lover" is Serebro's most popular single to date, having been featured in different press releases around the world. Diana Guglielmini said about the single, "And their single Mama Lover is the new summer hit: a song first released in August 2011 but that only just arrived in Italy. The video is currently a huge hit all over the Internet because the three girls, scantily clad and showing quite the erotic attitude are really easy on the eyes. That's why the younger generation- although not exclusively- is having way more fun watching the video than listening to this new hit." She then continued saying, "[The] Serebro are extremely close to capturing markets outside of Russia as well."

An Italian magazine wrote that the single reached 20 million views on YouTube and there are already more than 250 parodies of the single being performed. The song is also the group's first single to be released on iTunes.

Critical
Many critics have labelled the song as the group's signature song. Corriere.it, Corriere della Sera's website compared the group and the song to Russian group t.A.T.u. and their single "All The Things She Said". Excitenews.es described the song as "catchy and danceable" and finished saying, "A song that you can already hear on dance floors and that will surely be the soundtrack of way more than a simple road-trip this summer." A Spanish magazine The Vanguardia described the song as a "fun, sensual and spicy". The song has been labelled one of the best summer songs of 2012.

Commercial response
"Mama Lover" debuted at number 206 on the Russian Singles Chart. It later rose to number 24 after four weeks and then peaked at number 8. The success off "Мама Люба" was the same, debuting at number 206, then peaking at number 8 in Russia.

"Mama Lover" became the group's first single to chart outside of the Russian Federation since Song #1. The song debuted at number 45 on the Spanish Singles Chart. It rose to number 34, but later peaked at number 25. The song is currently placed at number 60 on the Czech Republic Singles Chart. The song peaked at number 7 on the Italian Singles Chart, later being certified platinum by the Federation of the Italian Music Industry for digital sales exceeding 30,000 units in Italy. It also debuted at number 22 on the Belgium Singles Chart (Flanders), and at number 6 on the Belgium Dance Charts.

The song was released in the United States and Canada not long after its original release. The song entered the US Dance/Electronic Songs chart at number thirty-eight and lasted for as sole week. The group became the first Russian act to chart on the Billboard chart since fellow Russian duo t.A.T.u's single "All About Us".

Music video
A music video was released on YouTube on 15 September 2011. However, the Russian version of the song was released instead of the English version, although the latter was the official single release. The music video features Elena, Anastasia and Olga driving through Russian streets, through a live-camera-shot based film. It received some censorship, as it features Olga swearing and Elena showing her underwear, even if it is pixilated in the first place. It is currently Russia's most viewed music video to date, having over 20 million views on YouTube. The video has at times been criticized because of the girls' actions and the presence of condoms, swearing and Olga's careless driving.

The English version of "Mama Lover" was released on YouTube.

Track listing
Digital download
(Released on 15 September 2011)
"Mama Lover" - 4:04
"Мама Люба (Mama Lyuba)" - 4:05

iTunes Remixes Single
"Mama Lover" (Мама Люба) - 4:02
"Mama Lover (English Version)" - 4:02
"Mama Lover (Matrick Remix)" - 5:46
"Mama Lover (Slava Inside Remix)" - 5:42
"Mama Lover (DJ V1t & DJ Johnny Clash Remix)" - 6:11
"Mama Lover (DJ Amor Remix)" - 3:54
"Mama Lover (DJ Prado Remix)" - 7:15
"Mama Lover (Digital Nova Remix)" - 3:37
"Mama Lover (DJ Chixer Remix)" - 3:36
"Mama Lover (DJ La Remix)" - 4:04

New Zealand Remix Single
"Mama Lover" (Dab & Sissa Radio Edit) - 2:55
"Mama Lover" (Dab & Sissa Remix) - 5:51
"Mama Lover" (The Cube Guys Remix) - 7:04

Italian Remix EP
"Mama Lover" (Radio Edit) - 3:29
"Mama Lover" (Extended Edit) - 5:32
"Mama Lover" (Gary Caos Remix) - 6:57
"Mama Lover" (Gary Caos Dub Mix) - 6:19
"Mama Lover" - 4:02

UK Remixes EP
"Mama Lover" (Wawa Remix Edit) - 3:29
"Mama Lover" (Wawa Remix) - 5:32
"Mama Lover" (Wawa Dub Mix) - 6:57
"Mama Lover" (Lockout's Club Remix) - 6:19
"Mama Lover" (Jorg Schmid Remix) - 4:02

Charts

Weekly charts

Year-end charts

Release history

Personnel
Anastasia Karpova – vocals
Elena Temnikova – vocals
Olga Seryabkina – vocals, lyrics
Maxim Fadeev – songwriter, producer

References

External links
 Official Website

2011 singles
Serebro songs
Songs written by Maxim Fadeev
2011 songs
Songs written by Olga Seryabkina
Universal Music Group singles
Music video controversies